Two Minds may refer to:

 "Two Minds", a 2015 song by Nero
 Two Minds, a 2010 EP by Ngaiire
 "Two Minds", a 1996 song by Tall Dwarfs from Stumpy

See also
In Two Minds, a television play by David Mercer
Of Two Minds (disambiguation)
Problem of other minds, a philosophical problem of whether other minds exist